Al Rosen (1924–2015) was an American baseball player and executive.

Al or Albert Rosen may also refer to:
 Al Rosen (actor) (1910–1990), American actor
 Albert Rosen (1924–1997), Austrian-born conductor

See also 
 Al Rose (1905–1985), tight end in the National Football League
 Albert Rose (disambiguation)